Andis Ērmanis (born 21 May 1990) is a Latvian handball player for Tenax Dobele and the Latvian national team.

He represented Latvia at the 2020 European Men's Handball Championship.

References

1990 births
Living people
Latvian male handball players
People from Dobele